Pakistan is one of nine states to possess nuclear weapons. Pakistan began development of nuclear weapons in January 1972 under Prime Minister Zulfikar Ali Bhutto, who delegated the program to the Chairman of the Pakistan Atomic Energy Commission (PAEC) Munir Ahmad Khan with a commitment to having the device ready by the end of 1976. Since PAEC, which consisted of over twenty laboratories and projects under reactor physicist Munir Ahmad Khan, was falling behind schedule and having considerable difficulty producing fissile material, Abdul Qadeer Khan, a metallurgist working on centrifuge enrichment for Urenco, joined the program at the behest of the Bhutto administration by the end of 1974. As pointed out by Houston Wood, "The most difficult step in building a nuclear weapon is the production of fissile material"; as such, this work in producing fissile material as head of the Kahuta Project was pivotal to Pakistan developing the capability to detonate a nuclear weapon by the end of 1984.

The Kahuta Project started under the supervision of a coordination board that oversaw the activities of KRL and PAEC. The Board consisted of A G N Kazi (secretary general, finance), Ghulam Ishaq Khan (secretary general, defence), and Agha Shahi (secretary general, foreign affairs), and reported directly to Bhutto. Ghulam Ishaq Khan and General Tikka Khan appointed Major General Ali Nawab as the ranking engineer on the program. Moderate uranium enrichment for the production of fissile material was achieved at KRL by April 1978. Eventually, the supervision passed to Lt General Zahid Ali Akbar Khan in President General Muhammad Zia-ul-Haq's Administration.

Pakistan's nuclear weapons development was in response to the loss of East Pakistan in 1971's Bangladesh Liberation War. Bhutto called a meeting of senior scientists and engineers on 20 January 1972, in Multan, which came to be known as "Multan meeting". Bhutto was the main architect of this programme, and it was here that Bhutto orchestrated the nuclear weapons programme and rallied Pakistan's academic scientists to build an atomic bomb in three years for national survival.

At the Multan meeting, Bhutto also appointed Munir Ahmad Khan as chairman of PAEC, who, until then, had been working as director at the nuclear power and Reactor Division of the International Atomic Energy Agency (IAEA), in Vienna, Austria. In December 1972, Abdus Salam led the establishment of Theoretical Physics Group (TPG) as he called scientists working at ICTP to report to Munir Ahmad Khan. This marked the beginning of Pakistan's pursuit of nuclear deterrence capability. Following India's surprise nuclear test, codenamed Smiling Buddha in 1974, the first confirmed nuclear test by a nation outside the permanent five members of the United Nations Security Council, the goal to develop nuclear weapons received considerable impetus.

Finally, on 28 May 1998, a few weeks after India's second nuclear test (Operation Shakti), Pakistan detonated five nuclear devices in the Ras Koh Hills in the Chagai district, Balochistan. This operation was named Chagai-I by Pakistan, the underground iron-steel tunnel having been long-constructed by provincial martial law administrator General Rahimuddin Khan during the 1980s. The last test of Pakistan was conducted at the sandy Kharan Desert under the codename Chagai-II, also in Balochistan, on 30 May 1998. Pakistan's fissile material production takes place at Nilore, Kahuta, and Khushab Nuclear Complex, where weapons-grade plutonium is refined. Pakistan thus became the seventh country in the world to successfully develop and test nuclear weapons, although according to a letter sent by A.Q. Khan to General Zia, the capability to detonate a nuclear bomb using highly enriched uranium as fissile material produced at KRL had already been achieved by KRL in 1984.

History 

After the Partition of India in 1947, India and Pakistan have been in conflict over several issues, including the disputed territory of Jammu and Kashmir. The uneasy relationships with India, Afghanistan, and the former Soviet Union explain its motivation to become a nuclear power as part of its defence and energy strategies.

Initial non-weapon policy

On 8 December 1953, Pakistan media welcomed the US Atoms for Peace  initiatives, followed by the establishment of Pakistan Atomic Energy Commission (PAEC) in 1956. In 1953, Foreign minister Muhammad Zafarullah Khan publicly stated that "Pakistan does not have a policy towards the atom bombs". Following the announcement, on 11 August 1955, the United States and Pakistan reached an understanding concerning the peaceful and industrial use of nuclear energy which also included a pool-type reactor worth $350,000. Before 1971, Pakistan's nuclear development was peaceful but an effective deterrent against India, as Benazir Bhutto maintained in 1995. Pakistan's nuclear energy programme was established and started in 1956 following the establishment of PAEC. Pakistan became a participant in US President Eisenhower's Atoms for Peace program. PAEC's first chairman was Dr. Nazir Ahmad. Although proposals to develop nuclear weapons were made in the 1960s by several officials and senior scientists, Pakistan followed a strict non-nuclear weapon policy from 1956 until 1971,  as PAEC under its chairman Ishrat Hussain Usmani made no efforts to acquire nuclear fuel cycle technology for the purposes of an active nuclear weapons programme.

In 1961, the PAEC set up a Mineral Center at Lahore and a similar multidisciplinary Center was set up in Dhaka, in the then East Pakistan. With these two centres, the basic research work started.

The first thing that was to be undertaken was the search for uranium. This continued for about three years from 1960 to 1963. Uranium deposits were discovered in the Dera Ghazi Khan district, and the first-ever national award was given to the PAEC. Mining of uranium began in the same year. Dr. Abdus Salam and Dr. Ishrat Hussain Usmani also sent a large number of scientists to pursue doctorate degrees in the field of nuclear technology and nuclear reactor technology. In December 1965, then-foreign minister Zulfikar Ali Bhutto visited Vienna where he met IAEA nuclear engineer, Munir Ahmad Khan. At a Vienna meeting on December, Khan informed Bhutto about the status of India's nuclear program.

The next landmark under Dr. Abdus Salam was the establishment of PINSTECH – Pakistan Institute of Nuclear Science and Technology, at Nilore near Islamabad. The principal facility there was a 5MW research reactor, commissioned in 1965 and consisting of the PARR-I, which was upgraded to 10 MWe by Nuclear Engineering Division under Munir Ahmad Khan in 1990. A second Atomic Research Reactor, known as PARR-II, was a Pool-type, light-water, 27–30 kWe, training reactor that went critical in 1989 under Munir Ahmad Khan. The PARR-II reactor was built and provided by PAEC under the IAEA safeguards as IAEA had funded this mega project. The PARR-I reactor was, under the agreement signed by PAEC and ANL, provided by the US Government in 1965, and scientists from PAEC and ANL had led the construction. Canada built Pakistan's first civil-purpose nuclear power plant. The Ayub Khan Military Government made then-science advisor to the Government, Abdus Salam, head of the IAEA delegation. Abdus Salam began lobbying for commercial nuclear power plants, and tirelessly advocated for nuclear power in Pakistan. In 1965, Salam's efforts finally paid off, and a Canadian firm signed a deal to provide the 137MWe CANDU reactor in Paradise Point, Karachi. The construction began in 1966 as PAEC its general contractor as GE Canada provided nuclear materials and financial assistance. Its project director was Parvez Butt, a nuclear engineer, and its construction completed in 1972. Known as KANUPP-I, it was inaugurated by Zulfikar Ali Bhutto as president, and began its operations in November 1972. Currently, Pakistan Government is planning to build another 400MWe commercial nuclear power plant, known as KANUPP-II; the PAEC completed its feasibility studies in 2009. However, the work has been on hold since 2009.

In the Indo-Pakistani War of 1965, which was the second of four openly declared Indo-Pakistani wars and conflicts, Pakistan solicited Central Treaty Organization (CENTO) assistance, but came under arms supply embargo in United Nations Security Council Resolution 211. Foreign minister (later Prime minister) Zulfikar Ali Bhutto aggressively began the advocating the option of "nuclear weapons programmes" but such attempts were dismissed by Finance minister Muhammad Shoaib and chairman Ishrat Hussain Usmani. Pakistani scientists and engineers' working at IAEA became aware of advancing Indian nuclear program towards making the bombs. Therefore, In October 1965, Munir Khan, director at the Nuclear Power and Reactor Division of the International Atomic Energy Agency (IAEA), met with Bhutto on an emergency basis in Vienna, revealing the facts about the Indian nuclear programme and Bhabha Atomic Research Centre in Trombay. At this meeting Munir Khan concluded: "a (nuclear) India would further undermine and threaten Pakistan's security, and for her survival, Pakistan needed a nuclear deterrent...".

Understanding the sensitivity of the issue, Bhutto arranged a meeting with President Ayub Khan 11 December 1965 at Dorchester Hotel in London. Munir Khan pointed out to the President that Pakistan must acquire the necessary facilities that would give the country a nuclear weapon capability, which was available free of safeguards and at an affordable cost, and there were no restrictions on nuclear technology, that it was freely available, and that India was moving forward in deploying it, as Munir Khan maintained.  When asked about the economics of such a programme, Munir Ahmad Khan estimated the cost of nuclear technology at that time. Because things were less expensive, the then costs were not more than US$150 million. After hearing the proposal President Ayub Khan swiftly denied the proposal, saying that Pakistan was too poor to spend that much money and that, if Pakistan ever needed the atomic bomb, it could somehow acquire it off the shelf.

Pakistan's weaker conventional weapon military in comparison to India and the Indian nuclear programme that started in 1967 prompted Pakistan's clandestine development of nuclear weapons. Although Pakistan began the development of nuclear weapons in 1972, Pakistan responded to India's 1974 nuclear test (see Smiling Buddha) with a number of proposals for a nuclear-weapon-free zone to prevent a nuclear arms race in South Asia. On many different occasions, India rejected the offer.

In 1969, after a long negotiation, the United Kingdom Atomic Energy Authority (UKAEA) signed a formal agreement to supply Pakistan with a nuclear fuel reprocessing plant capable of extracting  of weapons-grade plutonium annually. PAEC selected a team five senior scientists, including geophysicist Dr. Ahsan Mubarak, who were sent to Sellafield to receive technical training. Later Mubarak's team advised the government not to acquire the whole reprocessing plant, only key parts important to building the weapons, while the plant would be built indigenously.

The PAEC in 1970 began work on a pilot-scale plant at Dera Ghazi Khan for the concentration of uranium ores. The plant had a capacity of 10,000 pounds a day.
In 1989, Munir Ahmad Khan signed a nuclear cooperation deal and, since 2000, Pakistan has been developing a two-unit nuclear power plant with an agreement signed with China. Both these reactors are of 300 MW capacity and are being built at Chashma city of Punjab province. The first of these, CHASNUPP-I, began producing electricity in 2000, and 'CHASNUPP-II', began its operation in fall of 2011. In 2011, the board of governors of International Atomic Energy Agency gave approval of Sino-Pak Nuclear Deal, allowing Pakistan legally to build the 300-MW 'CHASNUPP-III' and 'CHASNUPP-VI' reactors.

Development of nuclear weapons 

In addition to the psychological setback for Pakistan, it had failed to gather any significant material support or assistance from its key allies, the United States and the People's Republic of China. Pakistan seemed to be isolated internationally, and in great danger; it felt that it could rely on no one but itself. Prime Minister Zulfiqar Ali Bhutto was "obsessed" with India's nuclear program. At a United Nations Security Council meeting, Bhutto drew comparisons between the Instrument of Surrender that ended the 1971 war, and the Treaty of Versailles, which Germany was forced to sign in 1919. There, Bhutto vowed never to allow a repeat.

At the Multan meeting on 20 January 1972, Bhutto stated, "What Raziuddin Siddiqui, a Pakistani, contributed for the United States during the Manhattan Project, could also be done by scientists in Pakistan, for their own people." Siddiqui was a Pakistani theoretical physicist who, in the early 1940s, worked on both the British nuclear program and the Manhattan Project.

In December 1972, Dr. Abdus Salam directed a secretly coded memo to Pakistani scientists working at the International Centre for Theoretical Physics (ICTP) in Italy to report to the Chairman of the Pakistan Atomic Energy Commission (PAEC), Munir Ahmad Khan, informing them about the program what was to be equivalent of the US "Manhattan Project." In an effort to instill a sense of pride, Salam noted that the heads of the Manhattan Engineer District were theoreticians, and informed the scientists at ICTP that a similar division was being established at PAEC; this marked the beginning of the "Theoretical Physics Group" (TPG). Other theoreticians at Quaid-e-Azam University would also join the TPG, then led by Salam who had done ground-breaking work for TPG. Among them was Riazuddin, Fayyazuddin, Masud Ahmad, and Faheem Hussain who were the cornerstone of the TPG.

Tedious mathematical work on fast neutron calculations, relativity, complex hydrodynamics and quantum mechanics were conducted by the TPG led by Salam until 1974 when he left Pakistan in protest, though he kept close contact with TPG. No such endeavours of the kind had taken place in the country and computerized numerical control (CNC) and basic computing facilities were non-existent at that time (though later acquired). For this purpose, the calculations on the high-performance computing and numerical analysis were performed by Dr. Tufail Naseem, a PhD graduate in mathematics from Cambridge University, assisted by other members of Mathematics Division– the division of pure mathematics at PAEC under Dr. Raziuddin Siddiqui and Asghar Qadir. About the lack of CNC facilities, Munir Ahmad Khan famously marked: "If the Americans could do it without CNC machines in the 1940s, why can't we do the same now.". With Abdus Salam departing,  Munir Ahmad eventually led the TPG and assisted in the calculations. Two types of weapon design were analyzed: the Gun-type fission weapon and the implosion nuclear weapon. The program turned to the more technically difficult implosion-type weapon design, contrary to the relatively simple 'gun-type' weapon.

In 1974, Abdul Qadeer Khan a metallurgist, joined the program and pushed for the feasibility of highly enriched uranium (HEU) fissile material and collaborated under Bashiruddin Mahmood at the PAEC– a moved that irked Khan. Preliminary studies on gaseous centrifuge were already studied by PAEC in 1967 but yielded few results. Khan advanced uranium enrichment from the expertise he had from the Urenco Group in the Netherlands. Under Khan's supervision, the Kahuta Research Laboratories (KRL) was set-up and engaged in clandestine efforts to obtain the necessary materials technology and electronic components for its developing uranium enrichment capabilities.

The TPG succeeded in the earlier implosion-type weapon design in 1977–78, with the first cold test conducted in 1983 by Ishfaq Ahmad. The program evolved towards the boosted fission weapon designs that were eventually used in the Chagai-I tests in 1998. Enormous production was undertaken by the Pakistan Atomic Energy Commission for feasibility of weapons grade plutonium but parallel efforts were mounted toward weapons-grade uranium after India's test, the Smiling Buddha, in 1974.

In 1983, Khan was convicted in absentia by the Court of Amsterdam for stealing centrifuge blueprints, though the conviction was overturned on a legal technicality. A nuclear proliferation ring was established by Khan through Dubai to smuggle URENCO nuclear technology to KRL after founding the Zippe method for the gas centrifuge

On 11 March 1983, PAEC, led by Munir Ahmad Khan, carried out its first subcritical testing of a working nuclear device. This is also called a cold test, and was codenamed Kirana-I. There were 24 more cold tests from 1983 to 1994.

Coordination between each site was overseen by the Directorate of Technical Development (DTD) under Dr. Zaman Sheikh (a chemical engineer) and Hafeez Qureshi, a mechanical engineer. The DTD was established by Munir Ahmad Khan in 1974 at the Metallurgical Laboratory and was tasked with development of tampers, reflective and explosive lenses, optics, and triggering mechanisms that are crucial in atomic weapons.  First implosion design was built by TPG in 1977 and the DTD eventually conducted the cold-test on 11 March 1983, codename Kirana-I. Between 1983 and 1990, PAEC carried out 24 more cold tests of various nuclear weapon designs and shifted its focused towards tactical designs in 1987 that could be delivered by all Pakistan Air Force fighter aircraft.

Dr. Ishrat Hussain Usmani's contribution to the nuclear energy programme is also fundamental to the development of atomic energy for civilian purposes as he, with efforts led by Salam, established PINSTECH, that subsequently developed into Pakistan's premier nuclear research institution. In addition to sending hundreds of young Pakistanis abroad for training, he laid the foundations of the Muslim world's first nuclear power reactor KANUPP, which was inaugurated by Munir Ahmad Khan in 1972. Scientists and engineers under Khan developed the nuclear capability for Pakistan within the late 1970s, and under his leadership PAEC had carried out a cold test of nuclear devices at Kirana Hills, evidently made from non-weaponized plutonium. The former chairman of PAEC, Munir Khan, was credited as one of the pioneers of Pakistan's atomic bomb by a study from the London International Institute for Strategic Studies (IISS), on Pakistan's atomic bomb program.

In his semi-official works of the Pakistani nuclear program history, Eating Grass: The Making of the Pakistani Bomb, Major General Feroz Hassan Khan wrote that Prince Sultan bin Abdulaziz al Saud visits to Pakistan's atomic facility were not a proof of the agreement between the two countries. However, Feroz Hassan acknowledged in his own words, that "Saudi Arabia provided generous financial support to Pakistan that enabled the nuclear program to continue.".

Policy 

Pakistan acceded to the Geneva Protocol on 15 April 1960. As for its Biological warfare capability, Pakistan is not widely suspected of either producing biological weapons or having an offensive biological programme. However, the country is reported to have well developed bio-technological facilities and laboratories, devoted entirely to the medical research and applied healthcare science. In 1972, Pakistan signed and ratified the Biological and Toxin Weapons Convention (BTWC) in 1974. Since then Pakistan has been a vocal and staunch supporter for the success of the BTWC. During the various BTWC Review Conferences, Pakistan's representatives have urged more robust participation from state signatories, invited new states to join the treaty, and, as part of the non-aligned group of countries, have made the case for guarantees for states' rights to engage in peaceful exchanges of biological and toxin materials for purposes of scientific research.

Pakistan is not known to have an offensive chemical weapons programme, and in 1993 Pakistan signed and ratified the Chemical Weapons Convention (CWC), and has committed itself to refrain from developing, manufacturing, stockpiling, or using chemical weapons.

Pakistan is not a party to the Non-Proliferation Treaty (NPT) and is not bound by any of its provisions.  In 1999, Prime Ministers Nawaz Sharif of Pakistan and Atal Bihari Vajpayee of India signed the Lahore Declaration, agreeing to a bilateral moratorium on further nuclear testing. This initiative was taken a year after both countries had publicly tested nuclear weapons. (See Pokhran-II, Chagai-I and II)

Since the early 1980s, Pakistan's nuclear proliferation activities have not been without controversy. However, since the arrest of Abdul Qadeer Khan, the government has taken concrete steps to ensure that Nuclear proliferation is not repeated and have assured the IAEA about the transparency of Pakistan's upcoming Chashma Nuclear Power Plant. In November 2006, The International Atomic Energy Agency Board of Governors approved an agreement with the Pakistan Atomic Energy Commission to apply safeguards to new nuclear power plants to be built in the country with Chinese assistance.

Protections 
In May 1999, during the anniversary of Pakistan's first nuclear weapons test, former Prime Minister of Pakistan Nawaz Sharif claimed that Pakistan's nuclear security is the strongest in the world. According to Dr. Abdul Qadeer Khan, Pakistan's nuclear safety program and nuclear security program is the strongest program in the world and there is no such capability in any other country for radical elements to steal or possess nuclear weapons. This claim is strongly disputed by foreign experts, citing the precedent of previous attacks of Pakistani military facilities and the nation's high level of instability.

Modernisation and expansion 
A Washington-based Nuclear Watch  think tank  of Boston University has reported that Pakistan is increasing its capacity to produce plutonium at its Khushab nuclear facility. The sixth nuclear test (codename: Chagai-II) on 30 May 1998, at Kharan was quite a successful test of a sophisticated, compact, but "powerful plutonium bomb" designed to be carried by aircraft, vessels, and missiles. These are believed to be tritium-boosted weapons. Only a few grams of tritium can result in an increase of the explosive yield by 300% to 400%." Citing new satellite images of the facility, the Institute for Science and International Security (ISIS) said the imagery suggests construction of the second Khushab reactor is "likely finished and that the roof beams are being placed on top of the third Khushab reactor hall". A third and a fourth reactor and ancillary buildings are observed to be under construction at the Khushab site.

In an opinion published in The Hindu, former Indian Foreign Secretary Shyam Saran wrote that Pakistan's expanding nuclear capability is "no longer driven solely by its oft-cited fears of India" but by the "paranoia about US attacks on its strategic assets." Noting recent changes in Pakistan's nuclear doctrine, Saran said "the Pakistan Military and civilian elite is convinced that the United States has also become a dangerous adversary, which seeks to disable, disarm or take forcible possession of Pakistan's nuclear arsenals and its status as nuclear power."

, Pakistan has been reportedly developing smaller, tactical nuclear weapons for use on the battlefield. This is consistent with earlier statements from a meeting of the National Command Authority (which directs nuclear policy and development) saying Pakistan is developing "a full-spectrum deterrence capability to deter all forms of aggression."

Arms control proposals 
Pakistan has over the years proposed a number of bilateral or regional non-proliferation steps and confidence building measures to India, including:

 A joint Indo-Pakistan declaration renouncing the acquisition or manufacture of nuclear weapons, in 1978.
 South Asian Nuclear Weapons Free Zone, in 1978.
 Mutual inspections by India and Pakistan of each other's nuclear facilities, in 1979.
 Simultaneous adherence to the NPT by India and Pakistan, in 1979.
 A bilateral or regional nuclear test-ban treaty, in 1987.
 A South Asia Zero-Missile Zone, in 1994.

India rejected all six proposals.

However, India and Pakistan reached three bilateral agreements on nuclear issues. In 1989, they agreed not to attack each other's nuclear facilities. Since then they have been regularly exchanging lists of nuclear facilities on 1 January of each year. Another bilateral agreement was signed in March 2005 where both nations would alert the other on ballistic missile tests. In June 2004, the two countries signed an agreement to set up and maintain a hotline to warn each other of any accident that could be mistaken for a nuclear attack. These were deemed essential risk reduction measures in view of the seemingly unending state of misgiving and tension between the two countries, and the extremely short response time available to them to any perceived attack. None of these agreements limits the nuclear weapons programs of either country in any way.

Disarmament policy 
Pakistan has blocked negotiation of a Fissile Material Cutoff Treaty as it continues to produce fissile material for weapons.

In a recent statement at the Conference on Disarmament, Pakistan laid out its nuclear disarmament policy and what it sees as the proper goals and requirements for meaningful negotiations:

 A commitment by all states to complete verifiable nuclear disarmament;
 Eliminate the discrimination in the current non-proliferation regime;
 Normalize the relationship of the three ex-NPT nuclear weapon states with those who are NPT signatories;
 Address new issues like access to weapons of mass destruction by non-state actors;
 Non-discriminatory rules ensuring every state's right to peaceful uses of nuclear energy;
 Universal, non-discriminatory and legally binding negative security assurances to non-nuclear weapon states;
 A need to address the issue of missiles, including development and deployment of Anti-ballistic missile systems;
 Strengthen existing international instruments to prevent the militarisation of outer space, including development of ASATs;
 Tackle the growth in armed forces and the accumulation and sophistication of conventional tactical weapons.
 Revitalise the UN disarmament machinery to address international security, disarmament and proliferation challenges.

Pakistan has repeatedly stressed at international fora like the Conference on Disarmament that it will give up its nuclear weapons only when other nuclear armed states do so, and when disarmament is universal and verifiable. It rejects any unilateral disarmament on its part.

Infrastructure

Uranium 
Pakistan's uranium infrastructure is based on the use of gas centrifuges to produce highly enriched uranium (HEU) at the Khan Research Laboratories (KRL) at Kahuta. Responding to India's nuclear test in 1974, Munir Khan launched the uranium program, codename Project-706 under the aegis of the PAEC. Physical chemist, Dr. Khalil Qureshi, did most of the calculations as a member of the uranium division at PAEC, which undertook research on several methods of enrichment, including gaseous diffusion, jet nozzle and molecular laser isotope separation techniques, as well as centrifuges. Abdul Qadeer Khan officially joined this program in 1976, bringing with him centrifuge designs he mastered at URENCO, the Dutch firm where he had worked as a senior scientist. Later that year, the government separated the program from PAEC and moved the program to the Engineering Research Laboratories (ERL), with A.Q. Khan as its senior scientist. To acquire the necessary equipment and material for this program, Khan developed a procurement ring. Electronic materials were imported from the United Kingdom by two liaison officers posted to the High Commission of Pakistan in London and Bonn Germany. The army engineer and ex-technical liaison officer, Major-General Syed Ali Nawab discreetly oversaw KRL operations in the 1970s including procuring the electronics that were marked as "common items." This ring was also illicitly used decades later, in the late 1980s and 90s to provide technology to Libya (under Muammar Gaddafi), North Korea, and Iran. Despite these efforts, it is claimed Khan Research Laboratories suffered setbacks until PAEC provided technical assistance. Although, A.Q. Khan disputes it and counter claims that PAEC is merely trying to take credit for KRL's success and that PAEC hindered progress at KRL after the two programs had been separated by Bhutto in 1976. In any case, KRL achieved modest enrichment of Uranium by 1978 and was ready to detonate an HEU uranium bomb by 1984. In contrast PAEC was unable to enrich any Uranium or produce weapons grade fissile material until 1998.

The uranium program proved to be a difficult, challenging and most enduring approach to scale up to industrial levels to military-grade. Producing HEU as a fissile material is even more difficult and challenging than extracting plutonium and Pakistan experimented with HEU as an implosion design as contrary to other nuclear states. Little and rudimentary knowledge was available of gas centrifuges at that time, and HEU fissile material was only known to the world for nuclear power usage; its military applications for HEU were non-existent. Commenting on the difficulty, mathematician Tasneem Shah; who worked with A.Q. Khan, was quoted in the book Eating Grass that "hydrodynamical problem in centrifuge was simply stated, but extremely difficult to evaluate, not only in order of magnitude but in detailing also." Many of Khan's fellow theorists were unsure about the feasibility of the enriched uranium on time despite Khan's strong advocacy. One scientist recalled his memories in Eating Grass: "No one in the world has used the [gas] centrifuge method to produce weapon grade material.... [T]his was not going to work, he [A.Q. Khan] is simply wasting time." Despite A.Q. Khan having difficulty getting his peers to listen to him, he aggressively continued his research and the program was made feasible in the shortest time possible. His efforts won him praise from Pakistan's politicians and military science circles, and he was now debuted as the "father of the uranium" bomb. On 28 May 1998, it was the KRL's HEU that ultimately created the nuclear chain reaction which led the successful detonation of boosted fission devices in a scientific experiment codenamed Chagai-I.

Plutonium 
In July 1976 Abdul Qadeer Khan told leading Pakistani politicians that the Pakistani Atomic Energy Commission (PAEC) was completely incapable of meeting a deadline of December of that year for producing enough plutonium for a nuclear weapon.  Shortly thereafter, he was placed in charge of a new organization independent of the PAEC tasked with producing plutonium for nuclear weapons. At that point, Pakistan had not yet completed the less difficult step of subcritical, cold testing, and would not do so until 1983 in Kirana Hills.

PAEC continued its research on plutonium and built the 40–50 MW (megawatt, thermal) Khushab Reactor Complex at Joharabad. In April 1998, Pakistan announced that the nuclear reactor was operational. The Khushab reactor project was initiated in 1986 by Munir Khan, who informed the world that the reactor was totally indigenous, i.e. that it was designed and built by Pakistani scientists and engineers. Various Pakistani industries contributed in 82% of the reactor's construction. The Project-Director for this project was Sultan Bashiruddin Mahmood. According to public statements made by the US Government officials, this heavy-water reactor can produce up to 8 to 10 kg of plutonium per year with increase in the production by the development of newer facilities, sufficient for at least one nuclear weapon. According to J. Cirincione of Carnegie Endowment for International Peace, Khushab's Plutonium production capacity has allowed Pakistan to develop lighter nuclear warheads that would be easier to deliver to any place in the range of the ballistic missiles.

PAEC also created a separated electromagnetic isotope separation program alongside the enrichment program, under Dr. G D Allam, a theoretical physicist. The plutonium electromagnetic separation takes place at the New Laboratories, a reprocessing plant, which was completed by 1981 by PAEC and is next to the Pakistan Institute of Nuclear Science and Technology (PINSTECH) near Islamabad, which is not subject to IAEA inspections and safeguards.

In late 2006, the Institute for Science and International Security released intelligence reports and imagery showing the construction of a new plutonium reactor at the Khushab nuclear site. The reactor is deemed to be large enough to produce enough plutonium to facilitate the creation of as many as "40 to 50 nuclear weapons a year." The New York Times carried the story with the insight that this would be Pakistan's third plutonium reactor, signalling a shift to dual-stream development, with Plutonium-based devices supplementing the nation's existing HEU stream to atomic warheads. On 30 May 1998, Pakistan proved its plutonium capability in a scientific experiment and sixth nuclear test: codename Chagai-II. There is controversy regarding environmental damage caused by the test, which dismissed by Balochistan media which worked with the government as misinformation, since the test were carried out hundred meters underground of  Ras Koh hill and the explosions were not damaging any environment of the any areas in Pakistan or India.

Stockpile 

Estimates of Pakistan's stockpile of nuclear warheads vary.  The most recent analysis, published in the Bulletin of the Atomic Scientists in 2010, estimates that Pakistan has 70–90 nuclear warheads. In 2001, the US-based Natural Resources Defense Council (NRDC) estimated that Pakistan had built 24–48 HEU-based nuclear warheads with HEU reserves for 30–52 additional warheads. In 2003, the US Navy Center for Contemporary Conflict estimated that Pakistan possessed between 35 and 95 nuclear warheads, with a median of 60. In 2003, the Carnegie Endowment for International Peace estimated a stockpile of approximately 50 weapons. By contrast, in 2000, US military and intelligence sources estimated that Pakistan's nuclear arsenal may be as large as 100 warheads. In 2018, the Federation of American Scientists estimated that the arsenal was about 120-130 warheads.

The actual size of Pakistan's nuclear stockpile is hard for experts to gauge owing to the extreme secrecy which surrounds the program in Pakistan. However, in 2007, retired Pakistan Army's Brigadier-General Feroz Khan, previously second in command at the Strategic Arms Division of Pakistans' Military told a Pakistani newspaper that Pakistan had "about 80 to 120 genuine warheads."

Pakistan's first nuclear tests were made in May 1998, when six warheads were tested under codename Chagai-I and Chagai-II. It is reported that the yields from these tests were 12 kt, 30 to 36 kt and four low-yield (below 1 kt) tests. From these tests Pakistan can be estimated to have developed operational warheads of 20 to 25 kt and 150 kt in the shape of low weight compact designs and may have 300–500 kt large-size warheads. The low-yield weapons are probably in nuclear bombs carried on fighter-bombers such as the Dassault Mirage III and fitted to Pakistan's short-range ballistic missiles, while the higher-yield warheads are probably fitted to the Shaheen series and Ghauri series ballistic missiles.

Second strike capability 
According to a US congressional report, Pakistan has addressed issues of survivability in a possible nuclear conflict through second strike capability. Pakistan has been dealing with efforts to develop new weapons and at the same time, have a strategy for surviving a nuclear war. Pakistan has built hard and deeply buried storage and launch facilities to retain a second strike capability in a nuclear war. In January 2000, two years past after the atomic tests, US intelligence officials stated that previous intelligence estimates "overstated the capabilities of India's homegrown arsenal and understate those of Pakistan". The United States Central Command commander, General Anthony Zinni told the NBC that longtime assumptions, that "India had an edge in the South Asian strategic balance of power, were questionable at best. Don't assume that the Pakistan's nuclear capability is inferior to the Indians", General Zinni quoted to NBC.

It was confirmed that Pakistan has built Soviet-style road-mobile missiles, state-of-the-art air defences around strategic sites, and other concealment measures. In 1998, Pakistan had 'at least six secret locations' and since then it is believed Pakistan may have many more such secret sites. In 2008, the United States admitted that it did not know where all of Pakistan's nuclear sites are located. Pakistani defence officials have continued to rebuff and deflect American requests for more details about the location and security of the country's nuclear sites.

Personnel 
In 2010, Russian foreign ministry official Yuriy Korolev stated that there are somewhere between 120,000 and 130,000 people directly involved in Pakistan's nuclear and missile programs, a figure considered extremely large for a developing country.

Alleged foreign co-operation 
Historically, the People's Republic of China (PRC) has been repeatedly charged with allegedly transferring missile and related materials to Pakistan. Despite China strongly dismissing the charges and accusations, the United States alleged China to have played a major role in the establishment of Pakistan's atomic bomb development infrastructure. There are also unofficial reports in Western media that the nuclear weapon technology and the weapon-grade enriched uranium was transferred to Pakistan by China. China has consistently maintained that it has not sold any weapon parts or components to Pakistan or anyone else. In August 2001, it was reported that US officials confronted China numerous times over this issue and pointed out "rather bluntly" to Chinese officials that the evidences from intelligence sources was "powerful." But they had been rebuffed by the Chinese, who have retorted by referring to the US support for Taiwan's military build-up which Beijing says is directed against it.

The former US officials have also disclosed that China had allegedly transferred technology to Pakistan and conducting putative test for it in 1980. However, senior scientists and officials strongly dismissed the US disclosure, and in 1998 interview given to Kamran Khan, Abdul Qadeer Khan maintained to the fact that, "due to its sensitivity, no country allows another country to use their tests site to explode the devices," although the UK conducted such tests in Australia and the United States. His statement was also traced by Samar Mubarakmand who acknowledged that cold tests were carried out, under codename Kirana-I, in a test site which was built by the Corps of Engineers under the guidance of the PAEC. According to a 2001 Department of Defense report, China has supplied Pakistan with nuclear materials and has provided critical technical assistance in the construction of Pakistan's nuclear weapons development facilities, in violation of the Nuclear Non-Proliferation Treaty, of which China is a signatory. In 2001 visit to India, the Chairman of the Standing Committee of the National People's Congress Li Peng rejected all the accusations against China to Indian media and strongly maintained on the ground that "his country was not giving any nuclear arms to Pakistan nor transferring related-technology to it." Talking to a media correspondents and Indian parliamentarians, Li Peng frankly quoted: "We do not help Pakistan in its atomic bomb projects. Pakistan is a friendly country with whom we have good economic and political relations."

In 1986, it was reported that both countries have signed a mutual treaty of peaceful use of civil nuclear technology agreement in which China would supply Pakistan a civil-purpose nuclear power plant. A grand ceremony was held in Beijing where Pakistan's then-Foreign Minister Yakub Khan signed on behalf of Pakistan in the presence of Munir Khan and Chinese Prime Minister. Therefore, in 1989, Pakistan reached agreement with China for the supply of the 300-MW commercial CHASHNUPP-1 nuclear reactor.

In February 1990, President François Mitterrand of France visited Pakistan and announced that France had agreed to supply a 900 MWe commercial nuclear power plant to Pakistan. However, after the Prime Minister Benazir Bhutto was dismissed in August 1990, the French nuclear power plant deal went into cold storage and the agreement could not be implemented due to financial constraints and the Pakistani government's apathy.  Also in February 1990, Soviet Ambassador to Pakistan, V.P. Yakunin, said that the Soviet regime was considering a request from Pakistan for the supply of a nuclear power plant. The Soviet and French civilian nuclear power plant was on its way during the 1990s. However, Bob Oakley, the US Ambassador to Pakistan, expressed US displeasure at the recent agreement made between France and Pakistan for the sale of a nuclear power plant. After the US concerns the civilian-nuclear technology agreements were cancelled by France and Soviet Union.

Declassified documents from 1982, released in 2012 under the US Freedom of Information Act, said that US intelligence detected that Pakistan was seeking suspicious procurements from Belgium, Finland, Japan, Sweden and Turkey.

According to more recent reports, it has been alleged that North Korea had been secretly supplying Pakistan with ballistic missile technology in exchange for nuclear weapons technology.

Doctrine 

Pakistan refuses to adopt a "no-first-use" doctrine, indicating that it would strike India with nuclear weapons even if India did not use such weapons first. Pakistan's asymmetric nuclear posture has significant influence on India's decision and ability to retaliate, as shown in 2001 and 2008 crises, when non-state actors carried out deadly attacks on Indian soil, only to be met with a relatively subdued response from India. A military spokesperson stated that "Pakistan's threat of nuclear first-use deterred India from seriously considering conventional military strikes." India is Pakistan's primary geographic neighbour and primary strategic competitor, helping drive Pakistan's conventional warfare capability and nuclear weapons development: The two countries share an 1800-mile border and have suffered a violent history—four wars in less than seven decades. The past three decades have seen India's economy eclipse that of Pakistan's, allowing the former to outpace the latter in defence expenditure at a decreasing share of GDP. In comparison to population, "India is more powerful than Pakistan by almost every metric of military, economic, and political power—and the gap continues to grow," a Belfer Center for Science and International Affairs report claims.

Theory of deterrence 

The theory of "N-deterrence" has been frequently being interpreted by the various government-in-time of effect of Pakistan. Although the nuclear deterrence theory was officially adopted in 1998 as part of Pakistan's defence theory, on the other hand, the theory has had been interpreted by the government since in 1972. The relative weakness in defence warfare is highlighted in Pakistan's nuclear posture, which Pakistan considers its primary deterrent from Indian conventional offensives or nuclear attack. Nuclear theorist Brigadier-General Feroz Hassan Khan adds: "The Pakistani situation is akin to NATO's position in the Cold War. There are geographic gaps and corridors similar to those that existed in Europe ... that are vulnerable to exploitation by mechanized Indian forces ... With its relatively smaller conventional force, and lacking adequate technical means, especially in early warning and surveillance, Pakistan relies on a more proactive nuclear defensive policy."

American political scientist Vipin Narang, however, argues that Pakistan's asymmetric escalation posture, or the rapid first use of nuclear weapons against conventional attacks to deter their outbreak, increases instability in South Asia. Narang supports his arguments by noting to the fact that since India's assured retaliation nuclear posture has not deterred these provocations, Pakistan's passive nuclear posture has neutralised India's conventional options for now; limited retaliation would be militarily futile, and more significant conventional retaliation is simply off the table."

The strategists in Pakistan Armed Forces has ceded nuclear assets and a degree of nuclear launch code authority to lower-level officers to ensure weapon usability in a "fog of war" scenario, making credible its deterrence doctrine. On further military perspective, the Pakistan Air Force (PAF), has retrospectively contended that "theory of defense is not view to enter into a "nuclear race", but to follow a policy of "peaceful co-existence" in the region, it cannot remain oblivious to the developments in South Asia." The Pakistan Government officials and strategists have consistently emphasised that nuclear deterrence is intended by maintaining a balance to safeguard its sovereignty and ensure peace in the region.

Pakistan's motive for pursuing a nuclear weapons development program is never to allow another invasion of Pakistan. President Muhammad Zia-ul-Haq allegedly told the Indian Prime Minister Rajiv Gandhi in 1987 that, "If your forces cross our borders by an inch, we are going to annihilate your cities."

Pakistan has not signed the Non-Proliferation Treaty (NPT) or the Comprehensive Test Ban Treaty (CTBT). According to the United States Department of Defense report cited above, "Pakistan remains steadfast in its refusal to sign the NPT, stating that it would do so only after India joined the Treaty. Pakistan has responded to the report by stating that the United States itself has not ratified the CTBT. Consequently, not all of Pakistan's nuclear facilities are under IAEA safeguards. Pakistani officials have stated that signature of the CTBT is in Pakistan's best interest, but that Pakistan will do so only after developing a domestic consensus on the issue, and have disavowed any connection with India's decision."

The Congressional Research Service, in a report published on 23 July 2012, said that in addition to expanding its nuclear arsenal, Pakistan could broaden the circumstances under which it would be willing to use nuclear weapons.

Nuclear Command and Control 

The government institutional organisation authorised to make critical decisions about Pakistan's nuclear posturing is the Pakistan National Command Authority (NCA), the genesis of which was in the 1970s and has been constitutionally established since February 2000. The NCA is composed of two civic-military committees that advises and console both Prime minister and the President of Pakistan, on the development and deployment of nuclear weapons; it is also responsible for war-time command and control. In 2001, Pakistan further consolidated its nuclear weapons infrastructure by placing the Khan Research Laboratories and the Pakistan Atomic Energy Commission under the control of one Nuclear Defense Complex. In November 2009, Pakistan President Asif Ali Zardari announced that he will be replaced by Prime Minister Yusuf Raza Gilani as the chairman of NCA. The NCA consists of the Employment Control Committee (ECC) and the Development Control Committee (DCC), both now chaired by the Prime Minister. The Foreign minister and Economic Minister serves as a deputy chairmen of the ECC, the body which defines nuclear strategy, including the deployment and employment of strategic forces, and would advise the prime minister on nuclear use. The committee includes key senior cabinet ministers as well as the respective military chiefs of staff. The ECC reviews presentations on strategic threat perceptions, monitors the progress of weapons development, and decides on responses to emerging threats. It also establishes guidelines for effective command-and-control practices to safeguard against the accidental or unauthorised use of nuclear weapons.

The chairman of the Joint Chiefs of Staff Committee is the deputy chairman of the Development Control Committee (DCC), the body responsible for weapons development and oversight which includes the nation's military and scientific, but not its political, leadership. Through DCC, the senior civilian scientists maintains a tight control of scientific and ethical research; the DCC exercises technical, financial and administrative control over all strategic organisations, including national laboratories and scientific research and development organisations associated with the development and modernisation of nuclear weapons and their delivery systems. Functioning through the SPD, the DCC oversees the systematic progress of weapon systems to fulfil the force goals set by the committee.

Under the Nuclear Command Authority, its secretariat, Strategic Plans Division (SPD), is responsible for the physical protection and to ensure security of all aspects of country's nuclear arsenals and maintains dedicated force for this purpose. The SPD functions under the Joint Chiefs of Staff Committee at the Joint Headquarters (JS HQ) and reports directly to the Prime Minister. The comprehensive nuclear force planning is integrated with conventional war planning at the National Security Council (NSC). According to the officials of Pakistan's military science circles, it is the high-profile civic-military committee consisting the Cabinet ministers, President, Prime minister and the four services chiefs, all of whom who reserves the right to order the deployment and the operational use of the nuclear weapons. The final and executive political decisions on nuclear arsenals deployments, operational use, and nuclear weapons politics are made during the sessions of the Defence Committee of the Cabinet, which is chaired by the Prime minister. It is this DCC Council where the final political guidelines, discussions and the nuclear arsenals operational deployments are approved by the Prime minister. The DCC reaffirmed its policies on development of nuclear energy and arsenals through the country's media.

US security assistance 
From the end of 2001 the United States has provided material assistance to aid Pakistan in guarding its nuclear material, warheads and laboratories. The cost of the program has been almost $100 million. Specifically the United States has provided helicopters, night-vision goggles and nuclear detection equipment. In addition, the US has funded the creation of a nuclear security training center, fencing, intrusion detectors, and identification systems.

During this period Pakistan also began to develop a modern export control regulatory regime with US assistance. It supplements the US National Nuclear Security Administration Megaports program at Port Qasim, Karachi, which deployed radiation monitors and imaging equipment monitored by a Pakistani central alarm station.

Pakistan turned down the offer of Permissive Action Link (PAL) technology, a sophisticated "weapon release" program which initiates use via specific checks and balances, possibly because it feared the secret implanting of "dead switches". But Pakistan is since believed to have developed and implemented its own version of PAL and US military officials have stated they believe Pakistan's nuclear arsenals to be well secured.

Security concerns of the United States 
Since 2004 the US government has reportedly been concerned about the safety of Pakistani nuclear facilities and weapons. Press reports have suggested that the United States has contingency plans to send in special forces to help "secure the Pakistani nuclear arsenal". In 2007, Lisa Curtis of The Heritage Foundation, while giving testimony before the United States House Foreign Affairs Subcommittee on Terrorism, Nonproliferation, and Trade, concluded that "preventing Pakistan's nuclear weapons and technology from falling into the hands of terrorists should be a top priority for the US." However Pakistan's government has ridiculed claims that the weapons are not secure.

Diplomatic reports published in the United States diplomatic cables leak revealed US and British worries over a potential threat posed by Islamists. In February 2009 cable from Islamabad, former US Ambassador to Pakistan Anne W. Patterson said "Our major concern is not having an Islamic militant steal an entire weapon but rather the chance someone working in [Pakistani government] facilities could gradually smuggle enough material out to eventually make a weapon."

A report published by The Times in early 2010 states that the United States is training an elite unit to recover Pakistani nuclear weapons or materials should they be seized by militants, possibly from within the Pakistani nuclear security organisation.  This was done in the context of growing Anti-Americanism in the Pakistani Armed Forces, multiple attacks on sensitive installations over the previous 2 years and rising tensions.  According to former US intelligence official Rolf Mowatt-Larssen, US concerns are justified because militants have struck at several Pakistani military facilities and bases since 2007. According to this report, the United States does not know the locations of all Pakistani nuclear sites and has been denied access to most of them. However, during a visit to Pakistan in January 2010, the US Secretary of Defense Robert M. Gates denied that the United States had plans to take over Pakistan's nuclear weapons.

A study by Belfer Center for Science and International Affairs at Harvard University titled 'Securing the Bomb 2010', found that Pakistan's stockpile "faces a greater threat from Islamic extremists seeking nuclear weapons than any other nuclear stockpile on earth".

According to Rolf Mowatt-Larssen, a former investigator with the CIA and the US Department of Energy there is "a greater possibility of a nuclear meltdown in Pakistan than anywhere else in the world. The region has more violent extremists than any other, the country is unstable, and its arsenal of nuclear weapons is expanding."

Nuclear weapons expert David Albright author of 'Peddling Peril' has also expressed concerns that Pakistan's stockpile may not be secure despite assurances by both the Pakistani and US governments. He stated Pakistan "has had many leaks from its program of classified information and sensitive nuclear equipment, and so you have to worry that it could be acquired in Pakistan," 
However the U.S. intelligence official said there is no indication that terrorists have gotten anything from Pakistan, and added there is confidence right now in Pakistan's security apparatus. The Pakistanis store their nuclear stockpile in a way that makes it difficult to put the pieces together; that is, components are located in different places. The official said Pakistan has put the appropriate safeguards in place.

A 2010 study by the Congressional Research Service titled 'Pakistan's Nuclear Weapons: Proliferation and Security Issues' noted that even though Pakistan had taken several steps to enhance Nuclear security in recent years 'Instability in Pakistan has called the extent and durability of these reforms into question.'

In April 2011, IAEA's deputy director general Denis Flory declared Pakistan's nuclear programme safe and secure. According to the IAEA, Pakistan is currently contributing more than $1.16 million in IAEA's Nuclear Security Fund, making Pakistan as 10th largest contributor.

In response to a November 2011 article in The Atlantic written by Jeffrey Goldberg highlighting concerns about the safety of Pakistan's nuclear weapons program, the Pakistani Government announced that it would train an additional 8,000 people to protect the country's nuclear arsenal. At the same time, the Pakistani Government also denounced the article. Training will be completed no later than 2013.

Pakistan consistently maintains that it has tightened the security over the several years. In 2010, the Chairman Joint Chiefs General Tariq Majid exhorted to the world delegation at the National Defence University that, "World must accept Pakistan as nuclear power." While dismissing all the concerns on the safety of country's nuclear arsenal, General Majid maintains to the fact: "We are shouldering our responsibility with utmost vigilance and confidence. We have put in place a very robust regime that includes "multilayered mechanisms" and processes to secure our strategic assets, and have provided maximum transparency on our practices. We have reassured the international community on this issue over and over again and our track record since the time our atomic bomb programme was made overt has been unblemished".

On 7 September 2013, the US Department of State said "Pakistan has a professional and dedicated security force that fully understands the importance of nuclear security."  Pakistan had earlier rejected claims in US media that the Obama Administration was worried about the safety of Pakistan's nuclear weapons, saying the country has a professional and robust system to monitor its nukes.

National Security Council 
 Economic Coordination Committee (ECC)
 Development Control Committee (DCC)
 Employment Control Committee (ECC)
 Financial Monitoring Unit (FMU)

Strategic combat commands 
 Air Force Strategic Command (AFSC)
 Army Strategic Forces Command (ASFC)
 Naval Strategic Forces Command (NSFC)

Weapons development agencies

National Engineering & Scientific Commission (NESCOM) 
 National Development Complex (NDC), Islamabad
 Project Management Organization (PMO), Khanpur
 Air Weapon Complex (AWC), Hasanabdal
 National Centre for Physics (NCP), Islamabad
 Maritime Technologies Complex (MTC), Karachi

Ministry of Defense Production 
 Pakistan Ordnance Factories (POF), Wah
 Pakistan Aeronautical Complex (PAC), Kamra
 Defense Science and Technology Organization (DESTO), Chattar

Pakistan Atomic Energy Commission (PAEC) 
 Directorate of Technical Development
 Directorate of Technical Equipment
 Directorate of Technical Procurement
 Directorate of Science & Engineering Services

Ministry of Industries & Production 
 State Engineering Corporation (SEC)
 Heavy Mechanical Complex Ltd. (HMC)
 Pakistan Steel Mills Limited, Karachi.
 Pakistan Machine Tools Factory

Delivery systems

Land 
, Pakistan possesses a wide variety of nuclear-capable medium range ballistic missiles with ranges up to 2750 km. Pakistan also possesses nuclear-tipped Babur cruise missiles with ranges up to 700 km. In April 2012, Pakistan launched a Hatf-4 Shaheen-1A, said to be capable of carrying a nuclear warhead designed to evade missile-defense systems. These land-based missiles are controlled by Army Strategic Forces Command of Pakistan Army.

Pakistan is also believed to be developing tactical nuclear weapons for use on the battlefield with ranges up to 60 km such as the Nasr missile. According to Jeffrey Lewis, director of the East Asia Non-proliferation Program at the Monterey Institute of International Studies, citing a Pakistani news article, Pakistan is developing its own equivalent to the Davy Crockett launcher with a miniaturised warhead that may be similar to the W54.

Air 
The Pakistan Air Force (PAF) is believed to have practised "toss-bombing" in the 1980s and 1990s, a method of launching weapons from fighter-bombers which can also be used to deliver nuclear warheads. The PAF has two dedicated units (No. 16 Black Panthers and No. 26 Black Spiders) operating 27 aircraft in each squadron (78 aircraft total) of the JF-17 Thunder, believed to be the preferred vehicle for delivery of nuclear weapons. These units are major part of the Air Force Strategic Command, a command responsible for nuclear response. The PAF also operates a fleet of F-16 fighters, of which 18 were delivered in 2012 and confirmed by General Ashfaq Parvez Kayani, are capable of carrying nuclear weapons. With a third squadron being raised, this would bring the total number of dedicated nuclear capable aircraft to a total of 75. The PAF also possesses the Ra'ad air-launched cruise missile which has a range of 350 km and can carry a nuclear warhead with a yield of between 10kt to 35kt.

A 2016 report by Hans M. Kristensen stated that "The F-16s were considered to be the first planes that are nuclear-capable in the Pakistan arsenal and the French Mirage III was upgraded as well to carry a new air launch cruise missile. But the United States made its case. What Pakistan does once they get the planes is inevitably up to them," he said. The report also stated that Pakistan is obliged under the terms of its contract to ask the US for permission before the fighters are converted. To date, the US has given only two countries (Pakistan and Israel) implicit permission to modify their F-16s to carry nuclear warheads.

It has also been reported that an air-launched cruise missile (ALCM) with a range of 350 km has been developed by Pakistan, designated Hatf 8 and named Ra'ad ALCM, which may theoretically be armed with a nuclear warhead. It was reported to have been test-fired by a Mirage III fighter and, according to one Western official, is believed to be capable of penetrating some air defence/missile defence systems.

Sea 
The Pakistan Navy was first publicly reported to be considering deployment of nuclear weapons on submarines in February 2001. Later in 2003 it was stated by Admiral Shahid Karimullah, then Chief of Naval Staff, that there were no plans for deploying nuclear weapons on submarines but if "forced to" they would be. In 2004, Pakistan Navy established the Naval Strategic Forces Command and made it responsible for countering and battling naval-based weapons of mass destruction. It is believed by most experts that Pakistan is developing a sea-based variant of the Hatf VII Babur, which is a nuclear-capable ground-launched cruise missile.

On 9 January 2017, Pakistan conducted a successful launch of the Babur III missile from an underwater mobile platform. The Babur-III has a range of 450 km and can be used as a second-strike capability. It has been speculated that the missile is ultimately designed to be incorporated with the Agosta 90B class submarine which has been reported to have been modified. However no such tests have been carried out yet. On 29 March 2018, Pakistan reported that the missile had again been successfully tested.

With a stockpile of plutonium, Pakistan would be able to produce a variety of miniature nuclear warheads which would allow it to nuclear-tip the C-802 and C-803 anti-ship missiles as well as being able to develop nuclear torpedoes, nuclear depth bombs and nuclear naval mines.

Nuclear submarine 
In response to INS Arihant, India's first nuclear submarine, the Pakistan Navy pushed forward a proposal to build its own nuclear submarine as a direct response to the Indian nuclear submarine program. Many military experts believe that Pakistan has the capability of building a nuclear submarine and is ready to build such a fleet. In February 2012, the Navy announced it would start work on the construction of a nuclear submarine to better meet the Indian Navy's nuclear threat. According to the Navy, the nuclear submarine is an ambitious project, and will be designed and built indigenously. However, the Navy stressed that "the project completion and trials would take anywhere from between 5 to 8 years to build the nuclear submarine after which Pakistan would join the list of countries that has a nuclear submarine."

See also 
 Weapons of mass destruction
 Chronology of Pakistan's rocket tests
 List of missiles of Pakistan
 Nuclear power in Pakistan
 Pakistan Armed Forces
 Nuclear doctrine of Pakistan
 Nuclear Command Authority (Pakistan)
 Pakistani missile research and development program

References 

Bibliography

Further reading

External links 
 Why He Went Nuclear by Douglas Frantz and Catherine Collins
 Nuclear Files.org Pakistan's nuclear conflict with India- background and the current situation
 Defense Export Promotion Organization – Ministry of Defense
 Pakistani & Indian Missile Forces (Tarmuk missile mentioned here)
 Annotated bibliography on Pakistan's nuclear weapons from the Alsos Digital Library
 The Woodrow Wilson Center's Nuclear Proliferation International History Project The Wilson Center's Nuclear Proliferation International History Project contains a collection of primary source documents on Pakistani nuclear development.
  
 
Project 706/726 Pakistani Nuclear Weapons Project (Complete History, Including Yield and Missile Data)
 Laser isotope separation research by Pakistan

Weapons of mass destruction
Weapons of mass destruction by country
Nuclear weapons programme of Pakistan
Explosives engineering